Fitzhugh is an English Anglo-Norman surname originating in Northamptonshire and Bedfordshire. It is patronymic as the prefix Fitz- derives from the Latin filius, meaning "son of". Its variants include FitzHugh, Fitz-Hugh, Fitz Hugh, fitz Hugh, and its associated given name turned surname Hugh. Fitzhugh is rare as a given name.

A family with the surname of Fitzhugh were proven descendants of Acaris, son of Bardolf, a son of Odo, Count of Penthièvre who was a close relative and important ally of William the Conqueror.

Surname
People with the name Fitzhugh include:

Charles Lane Fitzhugh (1838–1923), an American military officer
Courtney Fitzhugh, American hematologist-oncologist and scientist
Elisabeth West FitzHugh (1926–2017), art conservation scientist
George Fitzhugh (priest) (died 1505), chancellor of Cambridge University and Dean of Lincoln
George Fitzhugh (1806–1881), an American social theorist
Henry FitzHugh, 3rd Baron FitzHugh (c. 1358–1425)
Henry Fitzhugh (1801–1866), New York politician
Kristine Fitzhugh, murdered 2000; husband, Kenneth, convicted
Louise Fitzhugh (1928–1974), an American author
Percy Keese Fitzhugh (1876–1950), an American author
Steve Fitzhugh (born 1963), an American football player
William FitzHugh, 4th Baron FitzHugh (c. 1399–1452)
William Fitzhugh (1741–1809), an American politician
William H. Fitzhugh (1792–1830), son of the above and also an American politician
William W. Fitzhugh (born 1943), an American archaeologist and anthropologist

Given name
 Fitzhugh Dodson, American clinical psychologist, lecturer, educator and author
 Fitz Hugh Ludlow (1836–1870), American author, journalist, and explorer
 Fitzhugh Lee (1835–1905), U.S. Civil War cavalry commander and Governor of Virginia, descended from William Fitzhugh, above.
 Fitzhugh Townsend (1872–1906), American fencer

References

External links
 "Fitzhugh Genealogy", website about the history and genealogy of the Fitzhugh family

Patronymic surnames
Surnames from given names